Ernő Solymosi (21 June 1940 – 19 February 2011) was a Hungarian footballer. He was born in Diósgyőr. He played for the clubs Diósgyőri VTK, Újpest FC and Pécsi Dózsa as a midfielder and defender. He played 38 games and scored 7 goals for the Hungary national football team. He is most famous for his participation in the bronze medal-winning Hungarian team on the 1960 Summer Olympic Games and the European Championship of 1964, and for playing on the 1962 FIFA World Cup.

After his career as footballer, he worked for the Ministry for Home Affairs, being the personal guard of János Kádár, the communist leader of Hungary from 1956 to 1988. He has retired in 1993.

Notes

References
 
 

1940 births
2011 deaths
Hungarian footballers
Diósgyőri VTK players
Újpest FC players
1962 FIFA World Cup players
1964 European Nations' Cup players
Hungary international footballers
Olympic footballers of Hungary
Footballers at the 1960 Summer Olympics
Olympic bronze medalists for Hungary
Olympic medalists in football
Medalists at the 1960 Summer Olympics
Association football midfielders